Conotyla is a genus of millipedes in the family Conotylidae. There are about 15 described species in Conotyla.

Species
These 15 species belong to the genus Conotyla:

 Conotyla aeto Shear, 1971
 Conotyla blakei (Verhoeff, 1932)
 Conotyla bollmani (McNeill, 1887)
 Conotyla celeno Shear, 1971
 Conotyla elpenor Shear, 1971
 Conotyla fischeri Cook & Collins, 1895
 Conotyla jonesi Chamberlin, 1951
 Conotyla melinda Hoffman, 1971
 Conotyla ocypetes Shear, 1971
 Conotyla personata Shear, 1971
 Conotyla smilax Shear, 1971
 Conotyla vaga Loomis, 1939
 Conotyla venetia Hoffman, 1961
 Conotyla vista Shear, 1971
 Conotyla wyandotte (Bollman, 1888)

References

Further reading

External links

 

Chordeumatida
Millipedes of North America
Articles created by Qbugbot